Rapala tomokoae is a butterfly of the family Lycaenidae first described by Hisakazu Hayashi, Heinz G. Schroeder and Colin G. Treadaway in 1978. It is endemic to the Philippines. Its forewing length is 17–19 mm.

Subspecies
Rapala tomokoae tomokoae H. Hayashi, Schroeder & Treadaway, [1978] Mindanao, Samar, Leyte, Dinagat and Tawi Tawi
Rapala tomokoae takanamii H. Hayashi, [1984] Negros, Panay and Siquijor
Rapala tomokoae bilara M. & T. Okano,[1990] Bohol

References

 Hayashi, Hisakazu., 1978: New Species of Rapala and Sinthusa from Mindanao (Lepidoptera: Lycaenidae). Tyô to Ga. 29 (4): 215–219.
 Treadaway, Colin G., 1955: Checklist of the butterflies of the Philippine Islands. Nachrichten des Entomologischen Vereins Apollo, Suppl. 14: 7–118.
 
 , 2012: Revised checklist of the butterflies of the Philippine Islands (Lepidoptera: Rhopalocera). Nachrichten des Entomologischen Vereins Apollo, Suppl. 20: 1-64.

External links
 With images.

Rapala (butterfly)
Lepidoptera of the Philippines
Butterflies described in 1978